The Ministry of State Administration (MAE;) is a government department of East Timor with responsibility for local government and associated matters. It was formed in 2007.

Functions
The Ministry is responsible for the design, implementation, coordination and evaluation of policy for the following areas:
 local government;
 administrative decentralization;
 support to community organizations;
 promotion of local development;
 organization and execution of electoral and referendum processes;
 promotion of hygiene and urban organization; and
 classification and conservation of official documents with historical value.

Minister
The incumbent Minister of State Administration is Miguel Pereira de Carvalho. He is assisted by Lino de Jesus Torrezão, Deputy Minister of State Administration.

See also 
 Politics of East Timor

References

Footnote

Notes

External links

  – official site 

Decentralization
Elections in East Timor
State Administration
 
East Timor
East Timor, State Administration
East Timor
2007 establishments in East Timor